The 1906 European Rowing Championships were rowing championships held in the Italian commune of Pallanza on Lake Maggiore on 9 September. The competition was for men only and they competed in five boat classes (M1x, M2x, M2+, M4+, M8+).

Medal summary

Footnotes

References

European Rowing Championships
European Rowing Championships
Rowing
Rowing
European Rowing Championships
Rowing competitions in Italy
Sport in Verbania
Pallanza